Allah Now Bazar (also Romanized as Allah Now Bāzār; also known as ‘Alā Nūr Bāzār) is a village in Polan Rural District, Polan District, Chabahar County, Sistan and Baluchestan Province, Iran. At the 2006 census, its population was 52, in 10 families.

References 

Populated places in Chabahar County